The 1951 Newfoundland general election was held on 26 November 1951 to elect members of the 30th General Assembly of Newfoundland. It was won by the Liberal party.

Results

*Peter Cashin was the Independent elected in 1949. He joined the Progressive Conservatives in 1951 and led them during the subsequent election.

References
 

Elections in Newfoundland and Labrador
Newfoundland
1951 in Newfoundland and Labrador
November 1951 events in Canada